Wani may refer to:

Vani (custom), a child marriage custom in tribal areas of Pakistan
Wani (dragon), a Japanese dragon translated as "sea monster", "crocodile", or "shark"
Wani (scholar), a legendary scholar, sent from Korea to Japan during the reign of Emperor Ōjin
Wani (surname), Kashmiri surname
Wani (Vidhan Sabha constituency), constituency of the Maharashtra Vidhan Sabha
Wani Books, Japanese publishing company
Wani Station, train station in Ōtsu, Shiga, Japan
Wani, Yavatmal, a city and a municipal council in Yavatmal district in the Indian state of Maharashtra
Mangifera caesia, wani, an Indonesian term for the fruit, that resembles the mango but with white flesh
Wani (surname), surname in India (Jammu and Kashmir and Maharashtra)
 WANI, an American radio station

People with the name 
Altaf Wani, scientist
Altaf Ahmad Wani (born 1974), Kashmiri politician
Ashfaq Majeed Wani (1966–1990), Kashmiri separatist
Augustino Jadalla Wani, South Sudanese politician
Burhan Wani (1994–2016), commander of a Kashmiri militant group Hizbul Mujahideen
Ghulam Nabi Wani (1916–1981), politician from Jammu and Kashmir
Ghulam Qadir Wani (1953–1998), Kashmiri scholar and diplomat
Jagannath Wani (1934–2017), Indo-Canadian statistician and philanthropist
Mansukh C. Wani, Indo–American chemist
Mohan R. Wani (born 1965), Indian cell biologist
Nasir Aslam Wani (born 1964), Kashmiri politician
Rangnath Wani, Indian politician from Maharashtra
Wani Ardy (born 1984), Malaysian writer

See also 
 Ouani, a town in the Comoros